Cecil Albert de Lautour (1845 – 15 December 1930) was a 19th-century Member of Parliament in the Otago region of New Zealand.

He represented the Mount Ida electorate from 1876 to 1884.

In circa 1879, he moved to Napier to pursue a legal career. Thomas Peacock defeated him by 732 to 608 votes.

He died on 15 December 1930.

References

1845 births
1930 deaths
Mayors of Gisborne, New Zealand
Members of the New Zealand House of Representatives
New Zealand MPs for South Island electorates
Unsuccessful candidates in the 1884 New Zealand general election
Unsuccessful candidates in the 1893 New Zealand general election
19th-century New Zealand politicians